Astropyga magnifica is a species of sea urchins of the family Diadematidae. Their armour is covered with spines. Astropyga magnifica was first scientifically described in 1934 by Austin Hobart Clark.

References

Animals described in 1934
Diadematidae
Taxa named by Austin Hobart Clark